The banded corydoras or bearded catfish (Scleromystax barbatus) is a subtropical freshwater fish belonging to the subfamily Corydoradinae of the family Callichthyidae. It originates in coastal drainages in South America from Rio de Janeiro to Santa Catarina, Brazil.

Taxonomy
It was originally described as Callichthys barbatus by Jean René Constant Quoy & Joseph Paul Gaimard in 1824, from which it was transferred to genus Corydoras as Corydoras barbatus, a name which by which it is still being referred to in the aquarium industry. The species was further transferred to genus Scleromystax in 2003.

Description
The fish will grow in length up to 9.8 centimetres (3.9 in). This species has pronounced sexual dimorphism. The dorsal and pectoral fins of males reach, or almost reach, the caudal peduncle, and well-developed odontodes are inserted in fleshy tissue on a large area on the sides of the snout in fully grown males.

Habitat and ecology
It feeds on worms, benthic crustaceans, insects, and plant matter. It lays eggs in dense vegetation and adults do not guard the eggs. In captivity, as the sperm are released the female sinks to the bottom, resting on one of her pectoral fins while she starts fanning with the other pectoral fin. At this time, some eggs are released which fall into the pelvic fin basket and are apparently fertilized at that time.

In the aquarium
The banded corydoras is of commercial importance in the aquarium trade industry. Though peaceful, they get larger than most Corydoras and are therefore less suitable for small aquaria.

See also
 List of freshwater aquarium fish species

References 

Corydoras
Fish of South America
Fish of Brazil
Taxa named by Jean René Constant Quoy
Taxa named by Joseph Paul Gaimard
Fish described in 1824